James Thomas Gillette, Jr. (December 19, 1917January 9, 1990) was a professional American football halfback in the National Football League. Born in Courtland, Virginia, he played for six seasons with the Cleveland Rams (1940, 1944–1945), the Boston Yanks (1946), the Green Bay Packers (1947), and the Detroit Lions (1948).

He was originally drafted by the Green Bay Packers in 1940 but signed with the Cleveland Rams for six seasons before going back to Green Bay in 1946.

In 1983, Gillette was inducted into the Virginia Sports Hall of Fame.

Gillette's son, Walker Gillette, also played in the NFL.

External links 
 

1917 births
1990 deaths
People from Courtland, Virginia
Players of American football from Virginia
American football halfbacks
Virginia Cavaliers football players
Cleveland Rams players
Boston Yanks players
Green Bay Packers players
Detroit Lions players